is a private university in Inagi, Tokyo, Japan. The predecessor of the school was founded in 1927, and it was chartered as a university in 1993.

External links
 Official website 

Educational institutions established in 1927
Private universities and colleges in Japan
Universities and colleges in Tokyo
1927 establishments in Japan
Women's universities and colleges in Japan
Inagi, Tokyo